The Springfield Sallies were a women's professional baseball team who were members of the All-American Girls Professional Baseball League in the 1948 season and became a development team. The Sallies were based in Springfield, Illinois and played home games at Jim Fitzpatrick Memorial Stadium.

History

The hapless Sallies were the worst in the league, getting roughed up as a last–place expansion club with a 41–84 record, ending 35.5 games behind the 1st place Racine Belles in the Western Division.

The club was managed by former bigleaguer Carson Bigbee, but had no All–Stars, and the only players to have a significant year were second sacker Evelyn Wawryshyn, who tied for sixth place with a .266 batting average, and pitcher Doris Barr, who posted a 2.68 ERA with a career-high 116 strikeouts despite her 7–19 record.

From 1949 through 1951 the Sallies joined the Chicago Colleens as touring player development teams. Their tours included exhibition contests at Griffith Stadium and Yankee Stadium, then dissolved entirely by 1951.

AAGPBL executive Mitch Skupien, who later managed in the league, served as the general manager for both touring teams.

All-time roster

Managers

Manager–Chaperone

Chaperone

Sources
All-American Girls Professional Baseball League history
All-American Girls Professional Baseball League official website – Springfield Sallies seasons
All-American Girls Professional Baseball League official website – Manager/Player profile search results
All-American Girls Professional Baseball League Record Book – W. C. Madden. Publisher: McFarland & Company, 2000. Format: Hardcover, 294pp. Language: English. 
The Women of the All-American Girls Professional Baseball League: A Biographical Dictionary – W. C. Madden. Publisher:  McFarland & Company, 2005. Format: Softcover, 295 pp. Language: English. 
Golden Age Era Sports

 
All-American Girls Professional Baseball League teams
1948 establishments in Illinois
1950 disestablishments in Illinois
Baseball teams established in 1948
Baseball teams disestablished in 1950
Professional baseball teams in Illinois
Defunct baseball teams in Illinois